Xerocrassa caroli is a species of air-breathing land snail, a pulmonate gastropod mollusk in the family Geomitridae.
  

The species joined at least 8 subspecies.

 Xerocrassa caroli alegriae Schröder, 1984 [8]
 Xerocrassa caroli caroli (Dohrn & Heynemann, 1862) [8]
 Xerocrassa caroli conjungens (Jaeckel, 1952) [8]
 Xerocrassa caroli espartariensis Schröder, 1984 [8]
 Xerocrassa caroli jaeckeli (Altimira, 1965) [8]
 Xerocrassa caroli scopulicola (Bofill i Poch & Aguilar-Amat, 1924) [8]
 Xerocrassa caroli vedrae (Jaeckel, 1952) [8]
 Xerocrassa caroli vedranellensis (Jaeckel, 1952) [8]

Distribution

This species is endemic to Spain, where it occurs in the Pityusic islands of Ibiza and Formentera.

References

 Bank, R. A.; Neubert, E. (2017). Checklist of the land and freshwater Gastropoda of Europe. Last update: July 16th, 2017

External links

 Dohrn, H.; Heynemann, F. D. (1862). Zur Kenntnis der Molluskenfauna der Balearen. Malakozoologische Blätter. 9: 99-111

caroli
Molluscs of Europe
Endemic fauna of the Balearic Islands
Gastropods described in 1862